Tatar Hazara is a tribe consisting mostly of Sunni Hazaras in Afghanistan. They live mainly in northern parts of Afghanistan mostly with the neighboring of Uzbek people, the same as other Hazaras they have maintained all their Hazara cultural habits. They speak Hazaragi dialect of Persian.

See also 
 List of Hazara tribes

References 

Hazara tribes
Turkic peoples of Asia
Hazara history